The Disability Recreation and Sports SA was created in . Prior to that time, it was a subcommittee of the Paraplegic and Quadriplegic Association of South Australia. The organization was first called the Paraplegic and Quadriplegic Sports Association of South Australia. In 1987, Australian sport organizations around the country were trying to standardize their names. The organization changed its name to Wheelchair Sports SA. In 2013, it changed its name to Disability Recreation and Sports SA.

The organization strives to support people with a disability to lead active, healthy lives through participation in recreation, fitness and sport. DRS helps connect people with opportunities, assisting individuals to locate recreational activities most suitable to them, this individual support approach enables our members to engage in recreational opportunities according to several key criteria including location, age, gender and type of disability. 

The organization has struggled to keep steady funding. In May 2019, DRS had to undergo liquidation after exhausting all other options to maintain funding. 

The association is recognized by and responsible to answering to the South Australia State Government and Department of Recreation and Sport.

See also
 Australia at the Paralympics
 Parasports

References

Bibliography

External links
 Disability Recreation and Sports SA website

Australia at the Paralympics
Organisations based in South Australia
Sports organizations established in 1982
Parasports organisations in Australia
1982 establishments in Australia